Lekman is a surname. Notable people with the surname include: 

Björn Lekman (born 1944), Swedish speed skater
Jens Lekman (born 1981), Swedish musician
Sirkka Lekman (born 1944), Finnish teacher and politician

Surnames of Scandinavian origin